Neolithodes flindersi is a species of king crab found in southeastern Australia. They most closely resemble Neolithodes brodiei and Neolithodes nipponensis.

N. flindersi has been found to be parasitised by the snailfish genus Careproctus, who deposit eggs in the crabs' gill chambers. They have been found in Alcyonacea corals such as Chrysogorgia orientalis.

References

External links
 

King crabs
Crustaceans described in 2010
Crustaceans of Australia
Crustaceans of the Pacific Ocean
Taxa named by Shane T. Ahyong